Baynounah Sports Club is an Emirati professional football club based in Abu Dhabi. It currently plays in UAE First Division League.

History 
Founded in 2019 as Sport Support, they competed in the first season of the newly-formed Emirati third tier football league. They beat Al Hazem 2–1 in their first ever competitive match. Despite their good start, they would finish eighth in the league. 

In 2020, the club renamed itself Baynounah. They won the Hamdan bin Zayed championship after beating Al Hamra in the semifinal and Bu Hasa in the final by penalty kicks; this victory would help boost the clubs profile and garner a significant support in the Al Dhafra region.

Current squad 

As of 2022–23 season:

References

External links

Football clubs in Abu Dhabi
Baynounah
Association football clubs established in 2019
2019 establishments in the United Arab Emirates